Shahzeb Khanzada (Born 20 September 1986) is a Pakistani journalist, columnist and news anchor, currently hosting a Telivison program Aaj Shahzeb Khanzada Kay Sath on Geo News.

Personal life 
Shahzeb was born on September 20, 1986 in Karachi, Pakistan, to a Khanzada Rajput family. He is a descendant of Raja Nahar Khan, who was a  Rajput ruler of Mewat in the 14th century.

Career 
In 2009, Shahzeb started his career with Business Plus TV channel. He then hosted program To the Point on Express News. In 2013, he won the Best Anchorperson Award in the 4th Pakistan Media Awards.
Currently, he is host of the program "Aaj Shahzaib Khanzada Kay Sath" at Geo News.

References

Living people
Geo News newsreaders and journalists
Pakistani television talk show hosts
1986 births